Toxicodryas pulverulenta, commonly known as Fischer's cat snake, Fischer's tree snake, and the powdered tree snake, is a species of rear-fanged venomous snake in the family Colubridae. The species is native to Sub-Saharan Africa.

Etymology
The specific name, pulverulenta, means "dusted" or "powdery" in Latin. The common names, Fischer's cat snake and Fischer's tree snake, are in honour of German herpetologist Johann Gustav Fischer, who originally described this snake as a species new to science.

Geographic range
T. pulverulenta is found in Angola, Benin, Cameroon, Central African Republic, Democratic Republic of the Congo, Gabon, Ghana, Guinea, Ivory Coast, Liberia, Nigeria, Republic of the Congo, São Tomé and Príncipe,  Sierra Leone, South Sudan, Togo, and Uganda.

Habitat

Description
Smaller than other species in its genus, T. pulverulenta does not exceed one metre (40 inches) in snout-to-vent length (SVL). Dorsally, it is buff to pale brown. Ventrally, it is yellow, powdered with brown. Juveniles have a series of brown blotches on the flanks, each blotch enclosing a white area.

Diet
T. pulverulenta preys upon lizards and rodents.

Behaviour
T. pulverulenta is nocturnal and arboreal.

Reproduction
T. pulverulenta is oviparous.

References

Further reading
Boulenger GA (1896). Catalogue of the Snakes in the British Museum (Natural History). Volume III., Containing the Colubridæ (Opisthoglyphæ and Proteroglyphæ) .... London: Trustees of the British Museum (Natural History). (Taylor and Francis, printers). xiv + 727 pp. + Plates I–XXV. (Dipsadomorphus pulverulentus, pp. 68, 649).
Chippaux J-P, Jackson K (2019). Snakes of Central and Western Africa. Baltimore: Johns Hopkins University Press. 448 pp. .
Fischer JG (1856). "Neue Schlangen des Hamburgischen Naturhistorischen Museums ". Abhandlungen aus dem Gebiete der Naturwissenschaften 3 (4): 79–116. (Dipsas pulverulenta, new species, pp. 81–83 + Plate III, figures 1a–1c). (in German).
Spawls S, Howell K, Hinkel H, Menegon M (2018). Field Guide to East African Reptiles, Second Edition. London: Bloomsbury Natural History. 624 pp. . (Toxicodryas pulverulenta, p. 512).

Colubrids
Reptiles described in 1856
Reptiles of Africa